{{DISPLAYTITLE:C13H17N5O5}}
The molecular formula C13H17N5O5 (molar mass: 323.305 g/mol) may refer to:
 CMX521
 Pyroglutamyl-histidyl-glycine

Molecular formulas